Saint-Georges-Montcocq is a commune in the Manche department in Normandy in north-western France.

International relations

Saint-Georges-Montcocq is twinned with:
 Bransgore, United Kingdom

See also
Communes of the Manche department

References

Saintgeorgesmontcocq